Statistics of Liberian Premier League for the 2005 season.

Overview
It was contested by 8 teams, and Liberia Petroleum Refining Company Oilers won the championship.

League standings

References
Liberia - List of final tables (RSSSF)

Football competitions in Liberia
Lea